Fritz Dopfer (born 24 August 1987) is a German former World Cup alpine ski racer, specializing in the technical events of giant slalom and slalom.

Born in Innsbruck, Austria, to a German father and an Austrian mother, the family lived in both countries during his youth. They lived in Schongau, Bavaria, in Germany until Dopfer was age 10, when the family moved to Tyrol in Austria.

Dopfer raced for Austria through April 2007, then joined the German team that summer and made his World Cup debut in October 2007. During his first three seasons on the German team, he raced primarily on the European Cup circuit, with several World Cup starts per season, but no results. He moved up to the World Cup team for the 2011 season, and attained his first World Cup podium (and first top ten) in December 2011 in a giant slalom at Beaver Creek, Colorado. It was the first World Cup GS podium for a German male in nearly 18 years, since January 1994.

World Cup results

Season standings

Race podiums

9 podiums – (5 SL, 4 GS)

World Championship results

Olympic results

Video
You Tube.com – Dopfer takes 2nd in GS at Adelboden – 12 January 2013

References

External links

Fritz Dopfer World Cup standings at the International Ski Federation

Fritz Dopfer at DSV 
Fritz Dopfer at Nordica Skis
 
 
 

1987 births
German male alpine skiers
Alpine skiers at the 2014 Winter Olympics
Alpine skiers at the 2018 Winter Olympics
Olympic alpine skiers of Germany
German people of Austrian descent
Sportspeople from Innsbruck
Living people